Piotr Wyszomirski (born 6 January 1988) is a Polish handball player for Grundfos Tatabánya KC and the Poland men's national handball team.

On 1 February 2015, Poland, including Wyszomirski, won the bronze medal of the 2015 World Championship.

He also participated at the 2016 Summer Olympics in Rio de Janeiro, in the men's handball tournament.

References

External links
Player profile on Polish Handball Association website

1988 births
Living people
Polish male handball players
Sportspeople from Warsaw
SC Pick Szeged players
Expatriate handball players
Polish expatriate sportspeople in Germany
Polish expatriate sportspeople in Hungary
Handball players at the 2016 Summer Olympics
Olympic handball players of Poland